The 2005 Akron Zips football team represented the University of Akron in the 2005 NCAA Division I-A football season. Akron competed as a member of the East Division of the Mid-American Conference (MAC) The Zips were led by J. D. Brookhart in his second year as head coach. Brookhart would lead Akron to its first MAC title, upsetting Northern Illinois 31-30 in the conference championship game.

Schedule

References

Akron
Akron Zips football seasons
Mid-American Conference football champion seasons
Akron Zips football